The 1906 Kilkenny Senior Hurling Championship was the 18th staging of the Kilkenny Senior Hurling Championship since its establishment by the Kilkenny County Board.

Mooncoin won the championship after being awarded the title by the County Board. They had earlier drawn with Tullaroan in the final. This was their third championship title overall and their first in six championship seasons.

Results

Finals

References

Kilkenny Senior Hurling Championship
Kilkenny Senior Hurling Championship